"Chimera" is the sixteenth episode of the seventh season of the science fiction television series The X-Files. It premiered on the Fox network in the United States, on April 2, 2000, was written by David Amann, and directed by Cliff Bole. The episode is a "Monster-of-the-Week" story, unconnected to the series' wider mythology. "Chimera" earned a Nielsen household rating of 7.5, being watched by 12.89 million people in its initial broadcast. The episode received mostly positive reviews from critics.

The show centers on FBI special agents Fox Mulder (David Duchovny) and Dana Scully (Gillian Anderson) who work on cases linked to the paranormal, called X-Files. Mulder is a believer in the paranormal, while the skeptical Scully has been assigned to debunk his work. In this episode, Mulder investigates what appears to be the case of a missing woman from a small town, but soon turns out to be a murder by a spirit summoned from the underworld. Scully, meanwhile, must endure an uncomfortable stakeout.

Similar to the sixth season episode, "Arcadia", "Chimera" was written as "a suburban parable about perfection" that examined "the evil that lies beneath a prototypical white-bread suburban existence." The episode was produced at a time when both David Duchovny and Gillian Anderson were directing their own episodes, and in order to compensate, Anderson's role was drastically reduced in the episode.

Plot
In Bethany, Vermont, a raven frightens a little girl, Michelle Crittendon, at a park while a neighbor, Jenny Uphouse, watches. The bird is later found at her home. Her mother, Martha Crittendon, is then attacked and killed by a monster. Meanwhile, in Washington, D.C., Fox Mulder (David Duchovny) and Dana Scully (Gillian Anderson) are on a stakeout looking for a woman who is possibly killing prostitutes. Mulder believes she has the power to disappear because every time police attempt to arrest her she cannot be found. While on lookout, Mulder gets a call about the attack and leaves. Back at the office, Walter Skinner (Mitch Pileggi) tells Mulder that Crittendon disappeared and asks him what he knows about ravens. Mulder believes that the bird is usually associated with evil. Skinner tells Mulder that this case is a top priority because Crittendon is the wife of a federal judge. At the Crittendon home, Martha's husband, Howard, tells Mulder that his wife was cheating on him because he found birth control pills, which is suspicious because Howard has had a vasectomy. Another neighbor, Ellen Adderly, the wife of Sheriff Phil Adderly, is approached by Jenny and then sees a raven before the window of a nearby car shatters. At the Crittendon home, Michelle sees the raven outside her window again and Howard leaves to check it out, leading him to find a hand sticking out above the flower bushes. Later the police dig up Martha's body, with claw marks all over her face.

Ellen tells Mulder that she saw a reflection in the mirror earlier, and that's what killed Martha. Mulder believes that glass are doorways to a demonic dimension and that someone is summoning forth a demon to attack people. Ellen believes Jenny Uphouse summoned the spirits, but she denies it. Later, Ellen finds a skeleton key in her house and a raven by her baby's crib. In a mirror, Ellen sees the reflection of a monster chasing after her, but it suddenly breaks. She hides in the closet until Phil comes home and finds her. However, he attributes the commotion to stress, believing that she is imagining things. Mulder finds the skeleton key and it matches one found in Martha Crittendon's coat pocket. Mulder deduces that the sheriff is having an affair with Jenny. Mulder later tells him that Martha was pregnant and that he thinks he is the father. The sheriff reveals that the key opened the door to a motel, where he and Jenny met for clandestine affairs. Meanwhile, at the motel, Jenny sees ravens outside and is promptly attacked and killed by the creature.

Phil explains to Mulder that he wanted a divorce from Ellen two years ago, but she got pregnant and would not allow it. He also believes that he is the reason for this happening and that he somehow summoned the entity. It turns out that Ellen is the entity, which is given away by a cut in her back given by Jenny during the attack. Meanwhile, Scully reveals to Mulder that the mysterious prostitute killer was not an X-File at all, but rather a man disguised as a woman who talked to the prostitutes about religion and attempted to help them get out of the prostitution ring. Ellen transforms into the creature, attacks Mulder, and attempts to drown him in a bath tub, but stops when she sees her monstrous reflection in the water. She is placed in a psychiatric hospital, where the doctors diagnose her with multiple personality disorder. The episode ends with Ellen smiling knowingly as she sees a raven outside the window of her cell at the psychiatric hospital.

Production

Writing
The premise behind "Chimera" was to explore "the evil that [might lie] beneath a prototypical white-bread suburban existence." While these themes had previously been explored in the sixth-season episode, "Arcadia", the show's producers hoped to explore the same ideas in a more "straight-ahead scare" style, rather than supplementing the horror with humor (as was done in "Arcadia"). Series creator Chris Carter, in particular, saw the episode as "a chance to do something bold and new." Carter wanted the story to revolve around a crow, an image that he described simply as "scary". Originally, the episode was going to feature a "subterranean monster" and was aptly going to be titled "Subterranean Monster Blues".

The episode was written in "a burst of twenty-hour days". Greg Walker, who assisted David Amann, called the episode's script "a suburban parable about perfection." Matt Hurwitz and Chris Knowles noted in their book, The Complete X-Files, that "David Amman's script is an insightful commentary on suburban repression and self-delusion, which made a major comeback in the conservative late '90s." While the episode was being written, the production crew dealt with a number of issues, notably the fact that David Duchovny and Gillian Anderson were busy directing their own episodes—"Hollywood A.D." and "all things", respectively. To cope with their limited schedules, the producers planned out the filming of "Chimera" in a way that required Duchovny and Anderson to shoot only a limited number of scenes together. Anderson, in fact, was only needed for one day of filming for her auxiliary sub-plot involving the prostitute murderer.

Casting and filming
Rick Millikan, the show's casting director, was tasked with finding "normal-looking suburban people" to play the episode's various characters. Millikan later noted that "the show necessitated casting perfect people. But it's not that easy to find [...] normal-looking people. We've used so many people over the years that it's gotten harder and harder to find them." Several of the individuals cast had had roles in "obscure genre films": Wendy Schaal had appeared in the  1985 film Creature (1985), Gina Mastrogiacomo first was noted for her movie Alien Space Avenger (1989), Michelle Joyner first appeared in the anthology film Grim Prairie Tales (1990), and finally John Mese had a part in the movie Night of the Scarecrow (1995).

Most of the opening scene was shot in an actual Los Angeles backyard. However, because the producers felt that the locale was not suitable for the "tree-lined elements", they supplemented the scenes shot by also filming on the grounds of a nearby museum in Hollywood. The episode ran into several snags during filming. Director Cliff Bole had trouble getting the crows to "act on cue" and so several ravens were brought in as doubles. Bole later noted, "We got two ravens. One was very good at cawing and one was good at hopping." The ending sequence had to be re-shot several times. Producer Paul Rabwin explained, "Originally, we wanted to show a mirror image of the woman being attacked by the monster, but it didn't really sell." Eventually, the crew "glued candy glass onto a piece of plywood, angled the wood, and set the camera on that angle and so [they could film] the attack through the shattered fragments."

Broadcast and reception
"Chimera" first aired in the United States on April 2, 2000. This episode earned a Nielsen rating of 7.5, with an 11 share, meaning that roughly 7.5 percent of all television-equipped households, and 11 percent of households watching television, were tuned in to the episode. It was viewed by 12.89 million viewers. The episode aired in the United Kingdom and Ireland on Sky1 on May 7, 2000, and received 0.56 million viewers, making it the third most watched episode that week. Fox promoted the episode with the tagline "American Beauty? Tonight, in a perfect small town, with perfect neighbors and perfect families... lies an evil just waiting to show it's  'perfect' face."

The episode received mostly positive reviews from critics, with a few detractors. Robert Shearman and Lars Pearson, in their book, Wanting to Believe: A Critical Guide to The X-Files, Millennium & The Lone Gunmen, rated the episode four stars out of five, calling the script "very stylish". The two noted that "[David] Duchovny is very good here […] and, as a counterbalance, [Gillian] Anderson provides some great comic relief." Shearman and Pearson concluded that the episode was "a little too ponderously paced to be a classic episode, but it's clever and well crafted [which makes it] a rewarding stand-out." Rich Rosell from Digitally Obsessed awarded the episode 4 out of 5 stars and wrote that "Cawing birds, spirit portals and split personalities are the order of the day in a story that doesn't offer that much in genuine thrills, but the best moments are Scully's occasional complaints from the field." Paula Vitaris from Cinefantastique gave the episode a moderately positive review and awarded it two-and-a-half stars out of four. Despite noting that the episode "gets off to an awkward start", Vitaris concluded that "'Chimera' takes us into the heart of a quintessential X-Files family". Zack Handlen of The A.V. Club awarded the episode a "B+", noting that, while the episode was good, it "falls short of classic status, trying to make a metaphor into flesh, and not quite succeeding." Although Handlen enjoyed the way the episode explores and then connects the main characters, his main critique was that Ellen's transformation is never explicitly explained. He explained that, "If we had a sense of where her need comes from, if there was some hint at what drove her to this point, it would work; as is, the actress’s performance is excellent, but the character remains too generic."

Not all reviews were positive. Kenneth Silber from Space.com wrote a neutral review, saying, "Beyond that, there is little to be said, pro or con, for 'Chimera.' The episode is mildly interesting and avoids the puerility of recent episodes." Tom Kessenich, in his book Examinations, gave the episode a relatively negative review. He derided the lack of Anderson's character, summing up his feelings in the simple sentence, "No Dana Scully."

Footnotes

Bibliography

External links 

 

2000 American television episodes
The X-Files (season 7) episodes
Television episodes set in Vermont